Samuel Francis Adams (born September 3, 1963) is an American politician in Portland, Oregon. Adams was mayor of Portland from 2009 to 2012 and  previously served on the Portland City Council. Adams was the first openly gay mayor of a large U.S. city.

Adams ran an unsuccessful campaign to rejoin city council in 2020. From 2020 to 2023, he served as director of strategic innovations for the office of Portland Mayor Ted Wheeler. Adams resigned in January 2023, claiming he was leaving because of health problems, but Wheeler later revealed he had pushed Adams out for bullying female employees.

Early life and education
Samuel Adams was born in Butte, Montana to parents Larry and Karalie Adams. Adams was the third of four children. When he was a year old, his family moved to Richland, Washington, but shortly after moved to Newport, Oregon.

Adams graduated from high school in 1982, then started at the University of Oregon in 1984. Adams did not graduate from college until 2002, when he earned a Bachelor of Arts degree from the University of Oregon in political science.

Early career
Adams began his career in politics as a staffer on Peter DeFazio's 1986  campaign for the U.S. House of Representatives in Oregon's 4th district. He dropped out of the University of Oregon to work on Peter DeFazio's successful bid for Congress. After DeFazio won, Adams worked as a communications and policy assistant in his Oregon office, and on his re-election campaigns until 1988. Adams also worked for Democratic Majority Leaders David Dix and Carl Hosticka.

In 1988, Adams was elected chair of the Lane County (Oregon) Democratic Party. In 1990, Adams worked as the Oregon director for the highway safety organization Citizens for Reliable and Safe Highways (CRASH). He next worked on Vera Katz's 1992 mayoral campaign in Portland and served as her chief of staff 11 years.

Portland City Council
In a 2004 election for a seat on the Portland City Council, Adams received fewer votes than candidate Nick Fish in the primary election, but Adams won the general election.

As city commissioner, ran the Portland Bureau of Transportation and the Portland Bureau of Environmental Services. He also served as Portland City Council's liaison to the Arts and Culture and Small Business communities. As part of managing the Bureau of Transportation, he inherited the responsibility to oversee the development of the Portland Aerial Tram, which opened to the public in January 2007.

Adams and his staff maintained a blog highlighting their activities in the community, especially pertaining to Adams' priorities such as arts and culture, livability and environment, and transportation.

Mayor of Portland

2008 mayoral campaign

In October 2007, Adams announced his intentions to run for Mayor of Portland. His main opponent was Sho Dozono, a civic leader and businessman. In the primary election, held May 20, 2008, Adams won 58 percent of the vote and was elected without the need for a run-off. Dozono received 34 percent of the vote. Adams took office on January 1, 2009, becoming the first openly gay mayor of a major U.S. city.

Adams said his top three priorities were creating more family-wage jobs, reducing the high school dropout rate, and making Portland more sustainable.

In his first State of the City address on February 27, 2009, Adams outlined his goal of making Portland "the most sustainable city in the world." Adams emphasized reduction of carbon dioxide emissions and investment in efficient green energy as essential to the city's energy-environmental goals and called on the Oregon State Legislature to provide incentives for the expansion of green energy companies, notably Vestas Wind Systems, into the Portland metropolitan area.

Sexual misconduct and harassment allegations
In 2005, Adams met Beau Breedlove, a 17-year-old interning for Oregon State Representative Kim Thatcher. In September 2007, Adams denied rumors of a sexual relationship between the two, saying of Breedlove, "He was looking for a mentor. I tried to be both prudent and useful to him." In January 2009, after being confronted with a story in Willamette Week, Adams admitted to having a sexual relationship with Breedlove. Breedlove confirmed Adams' accounts. Adams apologized, saying he had lied to avoid accusations of grooming a minor and the likely disruption such allegations would cause in his mayoral campaign. Adams announced his intention to remain in office.

Oregon Attorney General John Kroger initiated a criminal investigation in January 2009. By June, Kroger's office announced that no charges would be filed and that there was "no credible evidence" of inappropriate sexual contact before the age of consent. Before Kroger's findings were made public, several newspapers called for Adams' resignation. The Portland Mercury and the board of the Portland Area Business Association, the LGBTQ chamber of commerce, spoke out against resignation. Out magazine columnist Dan Savage noted what he saw as hypocrisy, homophobia, and sex panic about age disparity in sexual relationships. In July 2009 a recall campaign asserted that Adams had lost the trust of the public and other elected officials to ill effect on the city's economy. It fell short of gathering the necessary number of signatures. A second effort began in late 2009, with financial backing from over a dozen regional businesses. The backers posited that a "lack of trust and political capital" was affecting their businesses' bottom lines. However, it too failed due to lack of sufficient signatures.

In November 2017, Adams was accused of repeated sexual harassment by a former aide between 2008-2012. In December 2017, he left his position at the World Resources Institute, although Adams said the allegations were not a factor in his choice to resign. Adams denied the allegations. In 2019,Willamette Week interviewed 10 staffers who were present at the time relating to the allegations and found "none say they believe Adams had sexually harassed Gonzalez."

Remainder of term

In 2009, Adams established a local economic stimulus plan by fast-tracking capital improvement projects, helped secure a Major League Soccer franchise, began work on the Oregon Sustainability Center established a free-bus-ride program designed for low-income students, secured $2.5 million in grants designed to help the city reduce diesel emissions, began construction of 15 miles of bike boulevards, and consolidated the city's permitting process.

In September 2009, Adams opposed the $4 billion, twelve-lane replacement for the I-5 bridge over the Columbia River, a plan he had once supported. Adams stated, "I'd rather settle for a bad bridge for another 25 years than a terrible bridge that punishes Portland for another 100 years." The twelve-lane idea was a compromise deal Adams helped write with then-Mayor Royce Pollard of Vancouver, Washington, in February 2009. The deal helped get the Portland City Council to agree for a bridge of up to twelve lanes, something Vancouver wanted in exchange for its support of Portland's MAX Light Rail extension across the I-5 bridge. Adams focused on improving the local economy by attracting large, sustainable employers to Portland, including a $200-million investment by the company Vestas.

In November of that year, Adams fired the police chief and then fired a police officer who had shot and killed an unarmed citizen. He recruited a wind company to spend $66 million on development and hire 400 employees, established the city's first economic development plan, developed programs designed to reduce Portland's high school dropout rate and make the city more sustainable, and, along with the rest of the city council, adopted gun control regulations that are designed to reduce shootings.

In 2011, Adams helped establish curbside composting, led a ban on single-use plastic bags, adopted a transgender-inclusive health plan for city employees, recruited a photovoltaic company to move to and invest $340 million in infrastructure in Portland, recruited several TV and movie companies to do business and spend about $100 million on production in Portland, established a $2.1 million seed fund to help start-up businesses in Portland, supported Occupy Portland at first, but later dispersed the camps, and cracked down on gangs with a 14-month police undercover operation that resulted in the arrests of 31 gang members.

On July 29, 2011, Adams announced on his official city blog that he would not seek a second term as Portland's mayor.

Later career
Days after his last day as Mayor, Adams was named executive director of the City Club of Portland, a non-profit organization best known as the host of public civic policy meetings.

On January 14, 2014, Adams announced that he was leaving the City Club to become director of U.S. Climate Initiatives at the World Resources Institute, a global nonprofit dedicated to environmental sustainability. Adams moved to Washington, D.C. as a result. Adams resigned from his position in December 2017 soon after sexual harassment allegations from his time as mayor were publicized, although Adams said the allegations were not a factor in his resignation.

Return to Portland politics 
In 2020, Adams returned to Portland and ran for City Council, but lost in the May primary. In 2021, he became the director of strategic innovations for mayor Ted Wheeler. In that role, Adams' goal was revitalizing the city after the coronavirus pandemic and protests. Adams led initiatives in 2021 and 2022 to ban homeless camping, with the use of executive power to move houseless people into in mass shelters staffed by the National Guard. On January 10, 2023, Adams abruptly announced his resignation from his office, citing health problems due to "chronic anemia." Days later, it was revealed by Wheeler in a press conference that he had forced Adams to leave because Adams had repeatedly intimidated and bullied female employees. Wheeler revealed that several employees filed complaints with the Bureau of Human Resources, and that some employees left their jobs as a result of Adams' behavior.

Personal life

Adams, who is gay, remained closeted at work until he became Mayor Vera Katz's Chief of Staff in 1993. He broke the news to Katz for the first time 1992 after she offered him the job as her campaign manager, to which she replied "Sweetie, I don't give a damn." In discussing not disclosing his sexuality, Adams noted he came from a "family of tough Montanans" where "there's a premium on being tough and strong, and being queer and a faggot wasn't strong."

From 1992 until 2004, Adams was in a long-term relationship with Greg Eddie. During that time, in 1993, he was outed as gay by the alternative newspaper Willamette Week. In 2007, the former couple, in a challenge to the state constitution, filed suit against the State of Oregon to dissolve their domestic partnership and divide Adams' future pension.

Adams met his partner Peter Zuckerman, a journalist and author, in 2008.

Because of the Irish birth of his maternal grandfather, Adams holds dual Irish and American citizenship.

Adams had a recurring role on the IFC show Portlandia as assistant to Portland's fictional mayor played by Kyle MacLachlan. He also appeared as himself in a 2012 episode of the Portland-based NBC show Grimm.

Filmography

See also
 List of LGBT people from Portland, Oregon

References

External links
 
 

1963 births
Living people
21st-century American male actors
21st-century American politicians
Gay politicians
LGBT mayors of places in the United States
LGBT people from Montana
LGBT people from Oregon
Male actors from Montana
Male actors from Oregon
Mayors of Portland, Oregon
Oregon Democrats
People from Newport, Oregon
People from Silver Bow County, Montana
Portland City Council members (Oregon)
South Eugene High School alumni
University of Oregon College of Arts and Sciences alumni